The Ring is a 1927 British silent romance film written and directed by Alfred Hitchcock and starring Carl Brisson, Lillian Hall-Davis and Ian Hunter.

Plot
A previously undefeated fairground boxer named "One Round" Jack Sander (Carl Brisson) is beaten in the ring by a mysterious challenger, who later is revealed to be Australian Heavyweight champion Bob Corby (Ian Hunter). Bob's manager is impressed with Jack's performance and offers him the chance to become Bob's full-time sparring partner, on the condition that he win a trial fight to be arranged at a later date.

Bob begins spending more time with Jack's girlfriend Mabel (Lillian Hall-Davis) and buys a bracelet for her to express his feelings. The two kiss but Mabel reluctantly puts a stop to it. The next day when Jack inquires about the bracelet, Mabel lies to Jack, telling him that Bob bought it for her because he didn't want to take the money.

Jack wins his trial fight and is made Bob's official sparring partner. Keeping his earlier promise to Mabel, he agrees to marry her the next day. Mabel goes through with the wedding, although somewhat reluctantly due to her new-found feelings for Bob. At the wedding reception Bob jokingly states that he wishes Mabel had been the prize at his and Jack's original fight. Jack boldly states that he would defend his wife in a fight against any man. A friendly exhibition match is arranged between the two fighters which Bob wins. After the fight Jack sees his bride flirting with Bob and suspects that they are having an affair. Jack declares his intent to fight Bob for the heavyweight championship, but is told he is not yet ranked high enough in the league to challenge Bob. Training intensively, Jack works his way up the rankings and eventually becomes the number one contender.

Jack arranges a party with his friends in his apartment as a way to surprise Mabel and let her know that he has won his latest fight and will now be fighting for Bob's title. Jack and his friends wait long into the night but Mabel does not show up. After Jack's friends leave, Jack stays up and waits for Mabel and eventually he sees her getting out of Bob's car. Jack angrily confronts Mabel about her liaisons with Bob and smashes a framed picture of him. Jack then goes to the club where Bob is and confronts him. Bob throws a punch but Jack knocks him out before he connects. Jack informs Bob that he is officially the number one contender and they will settle their differences in the ring.

On the day of the fight, the two fighters seem evenly matched until the final rounds where Bob starts to dominate Jack. Jack considers giving up until Mabel, seeing him in pain, runs over to his corner and declares that she wants to be with him, not Bob. Jack musters up his remaining energy and unleashes a flurry of punches in the final round, eventually knocking Bob out and winning the fight. Jack and Mabel embrace as Bob accepts defeat.

Cast
 Carl Brisson as 'One-Round' Jack Sander
 Lillian Hall-Davis as Mabel (as Lilian Hall Davis)
 Ian Hunter as Bob Corby
 Forrester Harvey as James Ware
 Harry Terry as Showman
 Gordon Harker as Jack's Trainer
 Charles Farrell as Second 
 Clare Greet as Fortune Teller 
 Tom Helmore 
 Minnie Rayner as Boxing Contestant's Wife 
 Brandy Walker as Spectator 
 Billy Wells as Boxer

Production
The film was made at Elstree Studios by the newly established British International Pictures, which emerged as one of the two British major studios during the late 1920s and began hiring leading directors from Britain and abroad. It was Hitchcock's first film for the company after joining from Gainsborough Pictures. It was also the first film to be released by the company.

Inception
Hitchcock was 28 years old when he directed The Ring, and this was the young filmmaker's fourth film. Hitchcock regularly attended boxing matches in London where he lived, and he was struck by the fact that a good number of the spectators appeared to be from good backgrounds and dressed in white. He also noticed that fighters were sprinkled with champagne at the end of each round. These details persuaded Hitchcock to start work on The Ring.

Screenplay
After directing Downhill and Easy Virtue, two stage adaptations for the Gainsborough company, Hitchcock was frustrated and jumped at the chance to develop an idea of his own. The Ring is commonly described as Hitchcock's only original screenplay although it actually had input from at least Eliot Stannard, who wrote all of Hitchcock's other silent films. Colleagues at the studio were impressed by the neatness of Hitchcock's script and his grasp of structure. What's more, writing for silent films came naturally to a director who already thought in visual terms. He was much less comfortable with dialogue, which goes some way to explain why he took no sole writing credit in any later films and worked extensively alongside other writers throughout his career.

Directing
The film was considered a major technical work by François Truffaut in the 1966 book Hitchcock/Truffaut, and by Thomas Chabrol and Eric Rohmer in their book about Hitchcock. It features use of the Schüfftan process to simulate a large audience in climactic scenes set in the Royal Albert Hall. Hitchcock returned to this technique years later in films like The Man Who Knew Too Much in its Royal Albert Hall sequence.

Reception
The film was a major success with critics; however, when it went on general release it was considered a box-office failure.

Preservation and home video status
A restoration of The Ring was completed in 2012 as part of the BFI's £2 million "Save the Hitchcock 9" project to restore all of the director's surviving silent films.

Like Hitchcock's other British films, all of which are copyrighted worldwide, The Ring has been heavily bootlegged on home video. Despite this, various licensed, restored releases have appeared on DVD, Blu-ray, and video-on-demand services from Optimum in the UK as well as Lionsgate and Kino Lorber in the US, and many others.

At the end of 2022, The Ring entered the public domain in the United States but only in its non-restored, scoreless form. It will remain copyrighted in the rest of the world until the end of 2050.

References

External links
 
 
 The Ring at the British Film Institute's Screenonline
 Alfred Hitchcock Collectors’ Guide: The Ring at Brenton Film

1927 films
1920s sports drama films
British boxing films
Films shot at British International Pictures Studios
Films directed by Alfred Hitchcock
British black-and-white films
British silent feature films
British sports drama films
Films set in England
1927 drama films
1920s English-language films
1920s British films
Silent sports drama films